Stanley Herbert Wilson (1899 - 29 November 1953) was a British composer and music teacher.

Life
Wilson was born in Berkhamsted, Hertfordshire and attended Berkhamsted School before winning a scholarship to the Royal College of Music in 1915, aged 15. His teachers included Charles Villiers Stanford (composition) and Adrian Boult (conducting). In 1917 he left to serve in the war, returning to the college a year later. From 1921 to 1945 he was the Music Master at Ipswich Grammar School, and conductor of the Ipswich Philharmonic Society. From 1945 he was Director of Music at Dulwich College, succeeding Arthur Gayford, a post he held for the rest of his life.

At Dulwich, Stanley Wilson set up a close association with the Royal Festival Hall, and 400 boys from the school participated in the Hall's opening celebrations in 1951. In 1953 he prepared the school choir to sing in a recording by Philips of the Berlioz Te Deum under Sir Thomas Beecham, but died suddenly the evening before the performance. The clarinetist Alan Hacker and composer Anthony Payne were pupils at Dulwich College under Wilson.

Compositions
In 1927 Stanley Wilson won a Carnegie award for his Skye Symphony op 38 (inspired by a holiday on Skye), and the score was published as part of the Carnegie Collection of British Music. It was broadcast by the BBC in 1929 and received performances around the UK, including at Bournemouth, where Wilson went on to become a regular guest conductor of the Municipal Orchestra between 1929 and 1934. In 1929 Wilson conducted his Piano Concerto No 1 at the Proms with James Ching (a pupil of his from Ipswich) as the soloist. The violinist Eda Kersey took up his Violin Concerto in 1930 for three performances. However, the Cello Concerto of 1936 wasn't performed until 1952 and the Piano Concerto No 2 wasn't performed at all during the composer's lifetime.

The Portrait Variations, written for the Birmingham Philharmonic String Orchestra, received more attention and were broadcast by the BBC in 1938. Each of the 14 variations reflects the personality (rather than the musical style) of a composer. Bach, Beethoven, Rimsky-Korsakov, Schumann and Debussy are included. One of the movements is a ' Self-Portrait' containing several quotations from his own music. The Boxhill Fantasy for strings also enjoyed several performances, but the Symphony No 2 '1942', with a choral finale and baritone solo, was only recently rediscovered (in the Royal College of Music library by Jürgen Schaarwächter) and remains unperformed. Many of Wilson's other manuscripts are held in the RCM library.

There are archived broadcast performances of the Skye Symphony, Cello Concerto and Double Concerto (1935), but no commercial recordings of Stanley Wilson's music are currently available except for two part songs, performed by The King's Singers in 1987. The City of London Chamber Choir, conducted by Christopher Field (who was taught by Wilson at Dulwich College) gave performances of the Te Deum and Jubilate Deo at St Edmundsbury Cathedral in 2016 and has made recordings available. Some of his educational piano music remains in print and continues to be used. Forsyth publishes four collections of these: Hansel and Gretel, Hiawatha, Ship Ahoy! and Under the Willows.

Works

References

External links
 Barnett, Robert. Stanley Wilson, Suffolk Composer: An Interim Note
 'The Stowaway' (from Ship Ahoy!) by Stanley Wilson, performed by Mary Ruth

English classical composers
20th-century classical composers
20th-century British composers
1899 births
1953 deaths